Edneusa de Jesus Santos Dorta (born 28 July 1976) is a visually impaired Brazilian Paralympic athlete. She represented Brazil at the 2016 Summer Paralympics held in Rio de Janeiro, Brazil and she won the bronze medal in the women's marathon T12 event. She qualified for the 2020 Summer Paralympics, in women's marathon T12 and she was one of the ten competitors.

In 2019, she won the silver medal in the event for visually impaired athletes at the World Para Athletics Marathon Championships.

References

External links 

 

1976 births
Living people
People from Rio Claro, São Paulo
Paralympic athletes of Brazil
Paralympic athletes with a vision impairment
Paralympic bronze medalists for Brazil
Paralympic medalists in athletics (track and field)
Athletes (track and field) at the 2016 Summer Paralympics
Athletes (track and field) at the 2020 Summer Paralympics
Medalists at the 2016 Summer Paralympics
Brazilian female marathon runners
Sportspeople from São Paulo (state)
20th-century Brazilian women
21st-century Brazilian women
Brazilian blind people